Oren Ambarchi (born 1969) is an Australian musician. He is a multi-instrumentalist who plays mainly electric guitar and percussion.

Biography
Oren Ambarchi was born in Sydney to an Iraqi Jewish family. Ambarchi has been performing live since 1986. In the late 1980s he played free jazz in Sydney, originally as a drummer. In an interview with ABC Radio broadcaster, Jon Rose, Ambarchi described how he started playing guitar, There happened to be one laying around in our rehearsal room. I picked it up and starting hitting it with drumsticks and using it in whatever way I wanted to use it in, and one thing led to another. I'm glad I wasn't trained. I've always loved rock music, I grew up listening to pop and rock, so that was in my mind, but I've also been interested in electronics. I never wanted to learn to play it properly, it was an object as much as an instrument.

He was a member of noise band Phlegm with Robbie Avenaim, with whom he co-organised the What Is Music Festival. His work focuses mainly on the exploration of the guitar, though he also plays drums and percussion in some of his live performances.

Ambarchi contributed to drone metal band Sunn O)))'s Black One album in 2005, and has since become a frequent live performer with the band, as well as contributing to the Oracle EP and Monoliths & Dimensions album. He also released a vinyl EP with Attila Csihar and Sunn O)))'s Greg Anderson under the name Burial Chamber Trio and has performed with Attila Csihar and Stephen O'Malley, the other half of Sunn O))), under the name Gravetemple. Ambarchi also works in popular music contexts and is a drummer for the group Sun with composer/musician Chris Townend.

In May 2010, he performed live with Boris at the Vivid Live Noise Night curated by Lou Reed and Laurie Anderson. Ambarchi collaborated with multi-instrumentalist Paul Duncan of Warm Ghost on experimental music projects. Ambarchi begins a series of duo recordings with multi-instrumentalist Jim O'Rourke, the first one being the acclaimed 'Indeed' in 2011. In 2017 he worked with composer Alvin Lucier, performing new compositions for electric guitar.

Partial discography

 (1998) Stacte (Jerker Productions)
 (1999) Stacte.2 (Jerker Productions)
 (1999) Clockwork with Robbie Avenaim (Jerker Productions, Room40 reissue 2005)
 (1999) The Alter Rebbe's Nigun with Robbie Avenaim (Tzadik)
 (1999) Insulation (Touch)
 (2000) Persona (ERS)
 (2000) Afternoon Tea with Christian Fennesz, Paul Gough, Peter Rehberg, Keith Rowe (Ritornell)
 (2000) Reconnaissance with Martin Ng (Staubgold)
 (2000) Stacte.3 (Plate Lunch)
 (2001) Suspension (Touch)
 (2002) Honey Pie with Robbie Avenaim and Keith Rowe (Grob)
 (2002) Thumb with Robbie Avenaim, Keith Rowe, Otomo Yoshihide, Sachiko M (Grob)
 (2002) Flypaper with Keith Rowe (Staubgold)
 (2002) Mort aux Vaches (Staalplaat)
 (2002) Stacte.4 (En/Of)
 (2003) Sun (Preservation Records) with Chris Townend
 (2003) Triste (Idea Records, Southern Lord)
 (2003) Vigil with Martin Ng (Quecksilber)
 (2003) My days are darker than your nights with Johan Berthling (Häpna)
 (2003) Oystered with Günter Müller and Voice Crack (Audiosphere)
 (2004) Grapes from the Estate (Touch, Southern Lord)
 (2004) Strange Love with Günter Müller and Philip Samartzis (For4Ears)
 (2005) Cloud with Keith Rowe, Toshimaru Nakamura and Christian Fennesz (Erstwhile)
 (2005) Black One with Sunn O))) (Southern Lord)
 (2006) Squire with Keith Rowe (For4Ears)
 (2006) Stacte Motors (Western Vinyl)
 (2006) Willow Weep and Moan for Me with Tetuzi Akiyama and Alan Licht (Antiopic)
 (2007) In the Pendulum's Embrace (Touch)
 (2007) Lost Like a Star (Bo'Weavil)
 (2007) Gravetemple with Stephen O'Malley and Attila Csihar (Southern Lord)
 (2007) Burial Chamber Trio with Greg Anderson and Attila Csihar (Southern Lord)
 (2008) Spirit Transform Me with Z'EV (Tzadik)
 (2008) A Final Kiss on Poisoned Cheeks (Table of the Elements)
 (2008) הופעה באוגנדה (Uganda)
 (2009) Monoliths & Dimensions with Sunn O))) (Southern Lord)
 (2010) Tima Formosa with Jim O'Rourke and Keiji Haino (Black Truffle)
 (2011) Hit & Run with Joe Talia (Touch)
 (2011) Indeed with Jim O'Rourke (Editions Mego)
 (2011) In a Flash Everything Comes Together as One There Is No Need for a Subject with Keiji Haino and Jim O'Rourke (Black Truffle/Medama)
 (2011) Dream Request with Robbie Avenaim (Bo'Weavil)
 (2012) The Mortimer Trap with Thomas Brinkmann (Black Truffle)
 (2012) Audience of One (Touch)
 (2012) Connected Robin Fox (Kranky)
 (2012) In the Mouth – a Hand with Fire! (Rune Grammofon)
 (2012) Black Plume with Keith Rowe and Crys Cole (Bocian)
 (2012) Raga Ooty / The Nilgiri Plateau (Bo'Weavil)
 (2012) Sagittarian Domain (Editions Mego)
 (2012) Wreckage with James Rushford (Prisma)
 (2012) なぞらない (Nazoranai) with Keiji Haino and Stephen O'Malley (Editions Mego)
 (2013) Cat's Squirrel with Merzbow (Black Truffle / Hospital Hill)
 (2014) Quixotism (Editions Mego)
 (2014) Tikkun with Richard Pinhas (Cuneiform Records)
 (2016) Hubris (Editions Mego)
(2018) Face Time with Kassel Jaeger and James Rushford (Black Truffle)
(2018) Hence with Jim O'rourke and U-zhaan (Editions Mego)
(2019) Simian Angel (Editions Mego)
(2019) Oglon Day with Mark Fell, Will Guthrie and Sam Shalabi (33 33)
(2020) Dreamlet (ATTN:SPAN)
(2022) Shebang

References

External links 
 Oren Ambarchi.com – Official website
 Oren Ambarchi on Discogs – Discogs page
Oren Ambarchi artist feature page on Wire Magazine 

1969 births
Living people
Australian experimental musicians
Australian guitarists
Australian people of Iraqi-Jewish descent
Electroacoustic improvisation
Free improvisation
Jewish Australian musicians
Jewish artists
Jewish heavy metal musicians
Rune Grammofon artists
Western Vinyl artists